FC Lernagorts Kapan, is a defunct Armenian football club from Kapan, Syunik Province.

History
Lernagorts Kapan was founded in 1963 during the Soviet period. After the independence of Armenia, the club participated in the first Armenian football competition after the split-up from the Soviet Union under the name Syunik Kapan. After the regular competition, they qualified for the championship stage, where they finished in 6th position, thus being qualified for the highest level in the 1993 season. However, they withdrew before the start of the season. Since then they have been up and down between the two divisions of the Armenian football league system.

In 2004, Lernagorts Kapan attempted to merge with Ararat Yerevan, but the merger failed. However, they played under the name Lernagorts-Ararat Kapan during the 2005 Armenian Premier League season, after a partnership agreement with Ararat Yerevan. In 2006, the club withdrew from the Armenian Premier League competition. Since then, the club has been inactive from professional football.

Name changes
 1963–89: FC Lernagorts Kapan
 1989–90: FC Kapan
 1991–93: FC Syunik Kapan
 1995–96: FC Kapan-81 FC
 1997–04: FC Lernagorts Kapan
 2004–06: FC Lernagorts-Ararat Kapan

Achievements
SSR Armenia League
 Winners (2): 1989, 1991
SSR Armenia Cup
 Winners (1): 1963

European history

Managers
 Vladimir Petrosyan (1990)
 Felix Veranyan (1991–92)
 Vladimir Petrosyan (1992–93)
 Felix Veranyan (????–00)
 Garnik Asatryan (2000–01)
 Arsen Chilingaryan (2001)
 Avetik Sarkisyan (2001–02)
 Samvel Nikolyan (2002)
 Garnik Ohanjanyan (2002–03)
 Vardan Javadyan (2003–04)

References

Lernagorts Kapan
Association football clubs established in 1963
Association football clubs disestablished in 2006
1963 establishments in Armenia
2006 disestablishments in Armenia